Amref Health Africa (formerly the African Medical and Research Foundation – AMREF) was founded in 1957 by three surgeons as the Flying Doctors of East Africa. Three doctors – Sir Michael Wood, Sir Archibald McIndoe and Tom Rees – drew up a plan to provide medical care in East Africa, where they had all worked for many years as reconstructive surgeons.

History 

Amref Health Africa was officially founded in 1957 to deliver mobile health services and to provide mission hospitals with surgical support. A medical radio network was developed to coordinate the service, and provide communication.

In the early 1960s, ground-based mobile medical services were added, along with 'flight clinics' for the under-served and remote areas in Kajiado and Narok districts of Kenya.

By 1975, training and education for rural health workers were already a major part of Amref Health Africa's efforts. This included the development of health learning materials.
During the late 1970s, Amref Health Africa continued providing mobile clinical and Maternal and Child Health (MCH) services. It also started to focus on community-based health care (CBHC) and training community health workers to deliver primary health care. Technical support units for CBHC, MCH, family planning and environmental health were also set up.

During the 1980s, Amref Health Africa moved into community health development, closer collaboration with the ministries of health in the region, and cooperation with international aid agencies. This set the organisation's course for the 1980s and beyond.
Greater emphasis was given to strengthening health systems and staff development, with special attention to health needs identified by communities themselves. Amref Health Africa staff gained experience in planning and the management of health services at a national level – expertise that has since been shared in-house with health ministries (the first was Uganda).

In the early 1990s Amref Health Africa established a unique year-long training course in community health. The 1990s also saw the organisation's work expand to include disease control initiatives, focusing on malaria, HIV/AIDS and TB.
During the mid 1990s, Amref Health Africa increased its focus on HIV/AIDS as it looked set to undo much of the progress made in health during the 20th century, and become a major burden to health systems in poor countries.

To meet this increased health care need, Amref Health Africa prioritised research, capacity building and advocacy relating to:

 HIV/AIDS
 TB and sexually transmitted infections
 Malaria
 Safe water and basic sanitation
 Family health
 Clinical services
 Training and health learning materials.

During the same period, in recognition of the need for partnerships at community level, Amref Health Africa engaged more with local groups to enable community-based planning, shared identification of issues and priorities, and efficient use of resources.

In 2000s, Amref Health Africa has highlighted the fact that despite huge investments by donors in health products and delivery of health services, a large percentage of Africans still have limited access to sufficient and quality health care.
Amref Health Africa's current ten-year strategy (2007–2017) focuses on finding ways to link health services to the people that need them by focusing more on people, and less on diseases – making responses tailor-made to specific community needs.

See also 
Clinical officers, healthcare providers in Sub-saharan Africa
Healthcare in Kenya

References

External links
 Daktari: A Surgeon's Adventures with the Flying Doctors of East Africa

Health in Africa
Health charities in England
Charities based in London
Healthcare in Kenya
Religious organizations
Foreign charities operating in Kenya
Archibald McIndoe